Saadat Shahr (pronounced sah-ah-dat-shawr, also Romanized as Sa‘ādat Shahr; also known as Sa‘ādatshahr) is a city and capital of Pasargad County, Fars Province, Iran. At the 2017 census, its population was 30,116 in 8,813 families.

Saadat Shahr is an agricultural town. 

The town has gained global attention due to its fascination with astronomy and stargazing. Women in the town sold their jewelry to pay for the town's observatory and telescope, and many of the residents have given part of their salaries for the project. The town's mosque regularly provides astronomy forecasts. On special occasions, the town shuts off its electricity so people could enjoy astronomical events.

In March 2007, excavations in the vicinity of Saadat Shahr revealed a soil dam dating back to the Achaemenid dynastic era.

References

Populated places in Pasargad County

Cities in Fars Province